Guruvayur State assembly constituency is one of the 140 state legislative assembly constituencies in Kerala. It is also one of the 7 state legislative assembly constituencies included in the Thrissur Lok Sabha constituency. As of the 2021 assembly elections, the current MLA is N. K. Akbar of CPI(M).

Location

Guruvayur Assembly Constituency lies in Chavakkad Taluk. Chavakkad is the lone Taluk of Thrissur district, which entirely lies in the erstwhile British Malabar. Chavakkad Taluk was created in 1956-57 by dividing the Ponnani taluk of erstwhile Malabar District. Present-day Chavakkad Taluk and much of the coastal region of Thrissur district were ruled by the Zamorin of Calicut until the 18th century. Guruvayur constituency shares its boundary with the Ponnani constituency of Malappuram district to the north, Kunnamkulam constituency to the northeast, and Manalur constituency both to southeast and south.

Local self governed segments
Guruvayur Niyamasabha constituency is composed of the following local self governed segments:

Members of Legislative Assembly 
The following list contains all members of Kerala legislative assembly who have represented the constituency:

Key

Election results

Niyamasabha Election 2016 
There were 1,90,919 registered voters in the constituency for the 2016 election.

Niyamasabha Election 2011 
There were 1,74,161 registered voters in the constituency for the 2011 election.

See also
 Guruvayur
 Thrissur district
 List of constituencies of the Kerala Legislative Assembly
 2016 Kerala Legislative Assembly election

References

Assembly constituencies of Kerala

State assembly constituencies in Thrissur district